Union Deportivo Banda Abou Is a Professional Football Club in Curaçao who represents the west side of the island Banda Abou.
This club is playing at the Curaçao Promé Divishon of the Curaçao Football Association "Federashon Futbòl Kòrsou".

Achievements
Kopa Antiyano – Netherlands Antilles Championship – N.A.V.U. (Nederlands Antilliaanse Voetbal Unie)
Winners : 1985, 1987, 1989–90, 1996
Runner-up : 2006

Sekshon Futbòl Pagá (S.F.P.) – Curaçao League – F.F.K. (Federashon Futbòl Kòrsou)
Winners : 1996, 1997, 2005–06, 2007–08
Runner-up : 1982, 1985, 1987, 1989

Kopa Gobernador – Governor Cup – F.F.K. (Federashon Futbòl Kòrsou)
Winners : 1997, 1999
Runner-up : 2001

Second Division Curaçao League (S.F.A.) – FA
Winners : 1993 – F.F.K. (Federashon Futbòl Kòrsou)
Winners : 1978 – F.F.P.C. (Federashon Futbol Profesional Corsow)

Promotion & Relegation series
section Promotion Play-offs:
F.F.K. (Federashon Futbòl Kòrsou) : 1993
section Relegation Play-offs:
F.F.K. (Federashon Futbòl Kòrsou) : 1992, 2010–11

Performance in CONCACAF club competition
CFU Club Championship: 1 appearance
CFU Club Championship 2007 – First Round group stage – (Caribbean Zone) – hosted by  Waterhouse in Jamaica

CONCACAF Champions' Cup: 3 appearances
1986 CONCACAF Champions' Cup – Second Round – (Caribbean Zone) – Lost to  SV Transvaal 6–2 in the global result.
1988 CONCACAF Champions' Cup – First Round – (Caribbean Zone) – Lost to  Montego Bay United 5–2 in the global result.
1990 CONCACAF Champions' Cup – First Round – (Caribbean Zone) – Lost to  RKV FC Sithoc 3–2 in the global result.

Squad 2019–20
Nationality given from place of birth.

Managers
 Gilmar Pisas (2013–14)
 Henry Caldera (2014–)
 Demy Rosario (2018–19)
 Ingemar 'Inchi' Pieternella (2019–20)
 Mark Muzo (2020–21)

Football clubs in Curaçao
Football clubs in the Netherlands Antilles
Association football clubs established in 1974
1974 establishments in Curaçao